Lingala  is a village in Krishna district of the Indian state of Andhra Pradesh. It is located in Mandavalli mandal of Gudivada revenue division.

References

External links

Villages in Krishna district